The  is the chief judge of the Supreme Court of Japan and is the head of the judicial branch of the Japanese government. 

The Chief Justice is ceremonially appointed by the Emperor of Japan after being nominated by the Cabinet; in practice, this is following the recommendation of the former Chief Justice.

List of Chief Justices of the Supreme Court of Japan

See also
List of Justices of the Supreme Court of Japan

References

External links
Official Website 
Official Profile 

 
Law of Japan
Chief Justices